Çukurbağ Peninsula is a small Mediterranean peninsula in Turkey.
 
It is located to the west of Kaş ilçe (district) of Antalya Province and to the north of the Greek island Kastellorizo. Kaş Marina is to the north of the peninsula.

The peninsula is known for touristic hotels and beaches.

References

Tourist attractions in Antalya Province
Kaş District
Peninsulas of Turkey